The president of Harvard University is the chief administrator of Harvard University and the ex officio president of the Harvard Corporation. Each is appointed by and is responsible to the other members of that body, who delegate to the president the day-to-day running of the university.

Harvard is a famously decentralized university, noted for the "every tub on its own bottom" independence of its various constituent faculties. They set their own academic standards and manage their own budgets. The president, however, plays an important part in university-wide planning and strategy. Each names a faculty's dean (and, since the foundation of the office in 1994, the university's provost), and grants tenure to recommended professors; however, the president is expected to make such decisions after extensive consultation with faculty members.

Harvard presidents have traditionally influenced educational practices nationwide. Charles W. Eliot, for example, originated America's familiar system of a smorgasbord of elective courses available to each student; James B. Conant worked to introduce standardized testing; Derek Bok and Neil L. Rudenstine argued for the continued importance of diversity in higher education.

Recently, however, the job has become increasingly administrative, especially as fund-raising campaigns have taken on central importance in large institutions such as Harvard. Some have criticized this trend to the extent it has prevented the president from focusing on substantive issues in higher education.

Each president is professor in some department of the university and teaches from time to time.

Harvard's current president is Lawrence Bacow, formerly the president of Tufts University. Claudine Gay will succeed him on July 1, 2023, becoming Harvard's 30th president.

History
At Harvard's founding it was headed by a "schoolmaster," Nathaniel Eaton. In 1640, when Henry Dunster was brought in, he adopted the title president. The origins of this title have been grounds for a certain amount of speculation.

Harvard was founded for the training of Puritan clergy, and even though its mission was soon broadened, nearly all presidents through the end of the 18th century were in holy orders.

All presidents from Leonard Hoar through Nathan Pusey were graduates of Harvard College. Of the presidents since Pusey, Bok earned his undergraduate degree at Stanford, Rudenstine at Princeton, and Summers and Bacow at MIT, but each earned a graduate degree at Harvard. Drew Gilpin Faust was the first president since the seventeenth century with no earned Harvard degree.

John Winthrop served as acting president in 1769 and again in 1773; but both times he declined an offer of the full presidency on grounds of old age.

Other minor acting presidents have included William Brattle, Edward Wigglesworth (1780–1781), Henry Ware (1810, 1828–1829), Andrew Preston Peabody (1862, 1868–1869), and Henry Pickering Walcott. Henry Rosovsky, former Dean of the Faculty of Arts and Sciences, served as acting president for three months in 1987 when Bok traveled abroad. Provost Albert Carnesale served as acting president for three months, from November 1994 to February 1995, during Rudenstine's leave of absence. After Faust's retirement in 2018, Bok served as interim president for a year, from July 1, 2006 to June 30, 2007, prior to Faust's appointment.

Presidents of Harvard

References

External links
Official Website
History of the Presidency

Harvard University